KCCH-LP (97.7 FM) is a radio station licensed to Helena, Montana, United States. The station is currently owned by Calvary Chapel of Helena.

References

External links
 

CCH-LP
Radio stations established in 2008
2008 establishments in Montana
CCH-LP